Malotwana Siding is a village in Kgatleng District of Botswana. It is located 10 km north of Mochudi and the population was 354 in the 2001 census. There is currently one school, Boiteko primary school. Most of the people who live in this village are mere subsistent farmers. If a visitor seeks accommodation he/she can find the luxurious Kebo and Rrakwadi motels. Even if there is such luxury one has to travel through a badly damaged road for their access.

References

Kgatleng District
Villages in Botswana